Cătălin Mihai Itu (born 26 October 1999) is a Romanian professional footballer who plays as a midfielder for Liga II club Politehnica Iași, on loan from CFR Cluj.

Club career
Itu made his debut in the Liga I for CFR Cluj on 19 May 2019, in a 0–1 loss to FCSB.

Career statistics

Club

Honours
CFR Cluj
Liga I: 2018–19, 2019–20, 2020–21, 2021–22
Supercupa României: 2020

References

External links
Cătălin Itu at Liga Profesionistă de Fotbal

1999 births
Living people
People from Dej
Romanian footballers
Association football midfielders
Liga I players
CFR Cluj players
FC Dinamo București players
Liga II players
FC Politehnica Iași (2010) players
Romania under-21 international footballers